Bartonella clarridgeiae is a Gram-negative bacteria from the genus Bartonella which was first isolated in the United States. Bartonella clarridgeiae is a zoonotic pathogen which can cause cat scratch disease.

Further reading
Clinical and Pathologic Evaluation of Chronic Bartonellahenselae or Bartonella clarridgeiae Infection in Cats

References

Bartonellaceae
Bacteria described in 1996